The 2017 San Diego Padres season was the 49th season of the San Diego Padres franchise in Major League Baseball and the Padres' 14th season at Petco Park. The Padres began the season on April 3 at the Los Angeles Dodgers. They ended the season on October 1 at the San Francisco Giants. They finished the season 71–91 to finish in fourth place in the National League West Division, 33 games behind the Los Angeles Dodgers. They missed the playoffs for the 11th straight year.

Regular season

Game log 

|-style="background:#fbb"
|1||April 3||@ Dodgers|| 3–14 || Kershaw (1–0) || Chacín (0–1) ||—|| 53,701 || 0—1 || L1
|-style="background:#cfc"
|2||April 4||@ Dodgers|| 4–0 || Richard (1−0) || Maeda (0–1) ||—|| 42,196 || 1—1 || W1
|-style="background:#fbb"
|3||April 5||@ Dodgers|| 1–3 || Hill (1–0) || Cahill (0–1) || Jansen (1) || 38,373 || 1—2 || L1
|-style="background:#fbb"
|4||April 6||@ Dodgers|| 2–10 || McCarthy (1–0) || Weaver (0–1) ||—|| 36,501 || 1—3 || L2
|-style="background:#cfc"
|5||April 7||Giants || 7–6 || Torres (1–0) || Kontos (0–1) || Maurer (1)|| 43,441 || 2—3 || W1
|-style="background:#cfc"
|6||April 8||Giants || 2–1 || Chacín (1–1) || Bumgarner (0–1) || Buchter (1) || 42,397 || 3—3 || W2
|-style="background:#fbb"
|7||April 9||Giants || 3–5 || Cueto (2–0) || Richard (1−1) || Melancon (1)|| 40,537 || 3—4 || L1
|-style="background:#cfc"
|8||April 10||@ Rockies || 5–3 || Díaz (1–0) || Chatwood (0−2) ||—|| 20,504 || 4—4 || W1 
|-style="background:#fbb"
|9||April 11||@ Rockies || 2–3 || Senzatela (1−0) || Díaz (1–1) || Holland (5)|| 20,664 || 4—5 || L1
|-style="background:#cfc"
|10||April 12||@ Rockies|| 6–0 || Lee (1−0) || Freeland (1−1) ||—|| 20,968 || 5—5 || W1
|-style="background:#fbb"
|11||April 14||@ Braves || 2–5 || Teherán (1−0) || Chacín (1–2) || Johnson (2) || 41,149 || 5—6 || L1
|-style="background:#fbb"
|12||April 15||@ Braves || 2–4 || Dickey (1−1) || Richard (1−2) || Johnson (3) || 41,149 || 5—7 || L2
|-style="background:#fbb"
|13||April 16||@ Braves || 2–9 || Colón (1−1) || Cahill (0–2) ||—|| 37,147 || 5—8 || L3
|-style="background:#fbb"
|14||April 17||@ Braves|| 4–5 || Johnson (2–0) || Maurer (0–1) ||—|| 24,516 || 5—9 || L4
|-style="background:#fbb"
|15||April 18||D-backs || 2–11 || Miller (2–1) || Cosart (0–1) ||—|| 19,869 || 5–10 || L5
|-style="background:#cfc"
|16||April 19||D-backs || 1–0 || Chacín (2–2) || Greinke (1–2) || Maurer (2) || 17,089 || 6–10 || W1
|-style="background:#cfc"
|17||April 20||D-backs|| 4–1 || Richard (2–2) ||Corbin (1–3) || Maurer (3) || 17,831 || 7–10 || W2
|-style="background:#cfc"
|18||April 21||Marlins || 5–3 || Cahill (1–2) || Phelps (2–2) ||—|| 30,413 || 8–10 || W3
|-style="background:#fbb"
|19||April 22||Marlins || 3–6 (11)|| Ziegler (1–0) || Torres (1–1) || Ramos (3) || 39,319 || 8–11 || L1
|-style="background:#fbb"
|20||April 23||Marlins || 3–7 || Koehler (1–1) || Stammen (0–1) ||—|| 26,070 || 8–12 || L2
|-style="background:#fbb"
|21||April 24||@ D-backs || 6–7 || Greinke (2–2) || Chacín (2–3) || Rodney (6) || 14,758 || 8–13 || L3
|-style="background:#fbb"
|22||April 25||@ D-backs || 3–9 || Corbin (2–3) || Richard (2–3) ||—|| 17,531 || 8–14 || L4
|-style="background:#cfc"
|23||April 26||@ D-backs || 8–5 || Buchter (1–0) || Rodney (1–1) || Maurer (4) || 12,215 || 9–14 || W1
|-style="background:#fbb"
|24||April 27||@ D-backs || 2–6 || Walker (3–1) || Weaver (0–2) ||—|| 15,452 || 9–15 || L1
|-style="background:#fbb"
|25||April 28||@ Giants || 3–4 || Law (3–0) || Buchter (1–1) || Melancon (5)|| 41,436 || 9–16 || L2
|-style="background:#cfc"
|26||April 29||@ Giants || 12–4 || Chacín (3–3) || Stratton (0–1) ||—|| 42,862 || 10–16 || W1
|-style="background:#cfc"
|27||April 30||@ Giants || 5–2 (12)|| Buchter (2–1) || Kontos (0–2) || Torres (1) || 41,989 || 11–16 || W2
|-

|-style=background:#cfc
|28||May 2||Rockies|| 6–2 || Cahill (2–2) || Chatwood (2–4) ||—|| 18,910 || 12–16 || W3
|-style=background:#fbb
|29||May 3||Rockies||  3–11 || Senzatela (4–1) || Weaver (0–3) || || 16,487 || 12–17 || L1
|-style=background:#fbb
|30||May 4||Rockies|| 2–3 (11)||Qualls (1–0) || Hand (0–1) || Holland (12) || 16,356 || 12–18 || L2
|-style=background:#fbb
|31||May 5||Dodgers|| 2–8 || Romo (1–1) || Torres (1–2) || Fields (1) || 34,320 || 12–19 || L3
|-style=background:#fbb
|32||May 6||Dodgers|| 2–10 || Kershaw (5–2) || Richard (2–4) ||—|| 36,337 || 12–20 || L4
|-style=background:#bbb
|—||May 7||Dodgers||colspan="7"|Postponed (rain) (Makeup date: Sept. 2)
|-style=background:#cfc
|33||May 8||Rangers|| 5–1 || Cahill (3–2) || Martinez (0–2) ||—|| 17,756 || 13–20 || W1
|-style=background:#fbb
|34||May 9||Rangers|| 0–11 || Griffin (4–0) || Weaver (0–4) ||—|| 14,224 || 13–21 || L1
|-style=background:#fbb
|35||May 10||@ Rangers|| 3–4 || Jeffress (1–2) || Hand (0–2) || Bush (2)|| 24,350 || 13–22 || L2
|-style=background:#fbb
|36||May 11||@ Rangers|| 2–5 || Dyson (1–4) || Maurer (0–2) ||—|| 22,405 || 13–23 || L3
|-style=background:#cfc
|37||May 12||@ White Sox || 6–3 ||Chacín (4–3) || González (3–3) || Maurer (5) || 24,194 || 14–23 || W1
|-style=background:#fbb
|38||May 13||@ White Sox|| 4–5 || Robertson (2–0) || Hand (0–3) ||—|| 29,111 || 14–24 || L1
|-style=background:#fbb
|39||May 14||@ White Sox|| 3–9 || Ynoa (1–0) || Buchter (2–2) ||—|| 22,518 || 14–25 || L2
|-style=background:#cfc
|40||May 15||Brewers|| 6–5 || Torres (2–2) || Drake (2–1) ||—|| 15,866 || 15–25 || W1
|-style=background:#fbb
|41||May 16||Brewers|| 2–6 || Nelson (2–2) || Richard (2–5) ||—|| 16,657 || 15–26 || L1
|-style=background:#fbb
|42||May 17||Brewers|| 1–2 || Barnes (1–0) || Maurer (0–3) || Knebel (2)|| 17,356 || 15–27 || L2
|-style=background:#fbb
|43||May 18||Brewers|| 2–4 || Davies (5–2) || Quackenbush (0–1) || Knebel (3) || 14,359 || 15–28 || L3
|-style=background:#fbb
|44||May 19||D-backs || 1–10 || Walker (4–3) || Weaver (0–5) || Delgado (1) || 22,187 || 15–29 || L4
|-style=background:#fbb
|45||May 20||D-backs || 1–9 || Ray (3–3) ||Perdomo (0–1)
||—
|29,696||15–30|| L5
|-style=background:#cfc
|46||May 21||D-backs || 5–1 || Richard (3–5) || Godley (1–1) ||—|| 27,198 || 16–30 || W1
|-style=background:#fbb
|47||May 23||@ Mets || 3–9 || Harvey (3–3) || Chacín (4–4) ||—|| 24,237 || 16–31 || L1
|-style=background:#cfc
|48||May 24||@ Mets || 6–5 || Buchter (3–2) || Smoker (0–2) || Hand (1)|| 23,933 || 17–31 || W1
|-style=background:#cfc
|49||May 25||@ Mets || 4–3 || Lamet (1–0) || Montero (0–4) || Hand (2)|| 24,131 || 18–31 || W2
|-style=background:#fbb
|50||May 26||@ Nationals || 1–5 || Scherzer (5–3) ||  Perdomo (0–2) || Glover (4) || 28,606 || 18–32 || L1
|-style=background:#fbb
|51||May 27||@ Nationals || 0–3 || Strasburg (6–1) || Richard (3–6) || Glover (5) || 37,357 || 18–33 || L2
|-style=background:#cfc
|52||May 28||@ Nationals || 5–3 || Yates (1–0) || Ross (2–1) || Maurer (6) || 30,243 || 19–33 || W1
|-style=background:#cfc
|53||May 29||Cubs|| 5–2 || Torres (3–2) || Hendricks (4–3) || Maurer (7) || 41,414|| 20–33 || W2
|-style=background:#cfc
|54||May 30||Cubs|| 6–2 || Lamet (2-0) || Butler (2–1)||—|| 33,232 || 21-33 || W3
|-style=background:#cfc
|55||May 31||Cubs|| 2–1 || Hand (1–3) || Uehara (1–3) || Maurer (8) || 23,995 || 22-33 || W4
|-

|-style=background:#cfc
|56||June 2||Rockies|| 8–5 || Richard (4–6) || Marquez (4–3) || Maurer (9) || 20,932 || 23–33 || W5
|-style=background:#fbb
|57||June 3||Rockies|| 1–10 || Chatwood (5–7) || Chacín (4–5) ||—|| 20,996 || 23–34 ||L1
|-style=background:#fbb
|58||June 4||Rockies|| 1–3 || Hoffman (3–0) || Cosart (0–2) || Holland (21) || 24,763 || 23–35 ||L2
|-style=background:#fbb
|59||June 6||@ D-backs|| 2–10 || Ray (6–3) || Lamet (2–1) || — || 25,883 || 23–36 || L5
|-style=background:#fbb
|60||June 7||@ D-backs|| 4–7 || Greinke (8–3) || Perdomo (0–3) || Rodney (15) || 22,079|| 23–37 || L4
|-style=background:#fbb
|61||June 8||@ D-backs|| 3–15 || Corbin (5–6) || Richard (4–7) ||—|| 21,340 || 23–38 || L5
|-style=background:#cfc
|62||June 9||Royals|| 6–3 || Chacín (5–5) || Strahm (1–3) || Maurer (10) || 23,055 || 24–38 || W1
|-style=background:#fbb
|63||June 10||Royals|| 6–12 || Wood (1–2) || Hand (1–4) ||—|| 26,107 || 24–39 || L1
|-style=background:#fbb
|64||June 11||Royals|| 3–8 || Junis (2–0) || Lamet (2–2) ||—|| 25,599 || 24–40 || L2
|-style=background:#cfc
|65||June 12||Reds|| 9–3 || Perdomo (1–3) || Arroyo (3–5) || — || 17,006 || 25–40 || W1
|-style=background:#cfc
|66||June 13||Reds|| 6–2 || Richard (5–7) || Feldman (5–5) || Maurer (11)|| 20,463 || 26–40 || W2
|-style=background:#cfc
|67||June 14||Reds|| 4–2 || Chacín (6–5) || Lorenzen (3–2) || Maurer (12) || 20,386 || 27–40 || W3
|-style=background:#fbb
|68||June 16||@ Brewers|| 5–6 (10) || Hughes (3–1) || Buchter (3–3) ||—|| 31,161 || 27–41 || L1
|-style=background:#cfc
|69||June 17||@ Brewers|| 7–5 (11) || Torres (4–2) || Drake (2–2) || Maton (1) || 34,312 || 28–41 || W1
|-style=background:#fbb
|70||June 18||@ Brewers|| 1–2 || Nelson (5–3) || Perdomo (1–4) ||—|| 34,518 || 28–42 || L1
|-style=background:#fbb
|71||June 19||@ Cubs|| 2–3 || Rondon (2–1) || Yates (1–1) || Davis (14) || 40,802 || 28–43 || L2
|-style=background:#fbb
|72||June 20||@ Cubs|| 0–4 || Montgomery (1–3) || Chacin (6–6) ||—|| 41,607 || 28–44 || L3
|-style=background:#cfc
|73||June 21||@ Cubs|| 3–2 || Maton (1–0) || Uehara (2–4) || Maurer (13) || 41,708 || 29–44 || W1
|-style=background:#cfc
|74||June 23||Tigers|| 1–0 || Perdomo (2–4) || Fulmer (6–6) || Maurer (14) || 25,477 || 30–44 || W2
|-style=background:#cfc
|75||June 24||Tigers|| 7–3 || Yates (2–1) || Greene (1–2) || — || 31,749 || 31–44 || W3
|-style=background:#fbb
|76||June 25||Tigers|| 5–7 || Rondón (1–1) || Maurer (0–4) || J. Wilson (6) || 29,595 || 31–45 || L1
|-style=background:#fbb
|77||June 27||Braves|| 0–3 || Newcomb (1–2) || Chacín (6–7) || Johnson (16) || 20,667 || 31–46 || L2
|-style=background:#cfc
|78||June 29||Braves|| 7–4 || Perdomo (3–4) || Colón (2–8) || Maurer (15) || 19,312 || 32–46 || W1
|-style=background:#cfc
|79||June 29||Braves|| 6–0 || 'Lamet (2–2) || García (2–6) || — || 20,936 || 33–46 || W2
|-style=background:#fbb
|80||June 30||Dodgers|| 4–10 || Wood (9–0) || Richard (5–8) || — || 39,254 || 33–47 || L1
|-

|-style=background:#fbb
|81||July 1||Dodgers|| 0–8 || Hill (5–4) || Overton (0–1) || — || 40,683 || 33–48 || L2
|-style=background:#cfc
|82||July 2||Dodgers|| 5–3 || Chacín (7–7)  || Maeda (6–4) || Maurer (16) || 41,604 || 34–48 || W1
|-style=background:#cfc
|83||July 4||@ Indians|| 1–0 || Torres (5–2) || Kluber (7–3) || Maurer (17) || 33,869 || 35–48 || W2
|-style=background:#cfc
|84||July 5||@ Indians|| 6–2 || Perdomo (4–4) || Bauer (7–7) || – || 18,765 || 36–48 || W3
|-style=background:#fbb
|85||July 6||@ Indians|| 2–11 || Tomlin (5–9) || Lamet (3–3) || — || 19,057 || 36–49 || L1
|-style=background:#cfc
|86||July 7||@ Phillies|| 4–3 || Hand (2–4) || Neris (2–3) || Maurer (18) || 38,533 || 37–49 || W1
|-style=background:#cfc
|87||July 8||@ Phillies|| 2–1 || Chacín (8–7) || Nola (6–6) || Maurer (19) || 33,216 || 38–49 || W2
|-style=background:#fbb
|88||July 9||@ Phillies|| 1–7 || Eickhoff (1–7) || Cahill (3–3) || — || 21,184 || 38–50 || L1
|-style="text-align:center; background:#bbcaff;"
|colspan="10"|88th All-Star Game in Miami, Florida
|-style=background:#fbb
|89||July 14||Giants|| 4–5 || Gearrin (3–2) || Richard (5–9) || Dyson (4) || 34,970 || 38–51 || L2
|-style=background:#cfc
|90||July 15||Giants|| 5–3 || Maurer (1–4) || Gearrin (3–3) || — || 36,266 || 39–51 || W1
|-style=background:#cfc
|91||July 16||Giants|| 7–1 || Cahill (4–3) || Samardzija (4–11) || — || 30,561 || 40–51 || W2
|-style=background:#fbb
|92||July 17||@ Rockies|| 6–9 || Márquez (7–4) || Perdomo (4–5) || Holland (29) || 37,561 || 40–52 || L1
|-style=background:#fbb
|93||July 18||@ Rockies|| 7–9 || Senzatela (10–3) || Lamet (3–4) || Holland (30) || 40,101 || 40–53 || L2 
|-style=background:#fbb
|94||July 19||@ Rockies|| 4–18 || Gray (3–1) || Richard (5–10) || — || 37,128 || 40–54 || L3
|-style=background:#cfc
|95||July 20||@ Giants|| 5–2 || Chacín (9–7) || Bumgarner (0–4) || Maurer (20) || 41,166 || 41–54 || W1
|-style=background:#cfc
|96||July 21||@ Giants|| 12–9 (11)|| Maton (2–0) || Kontos (0–4) || — || 41,145 || 42–54 || W2
|-style=background:#fbb
|97||July 22||@ Giants|| 4–5 (12)|| Osich (3–1) || Quackenbush (0–2) || — || 40,936 || 42–55 || L1
|-style=background:#cfc
|98||July 23||@ Giants|| 5–2 || Lamet (4–4) || Blach (6–6) || Hand (3) || 41,372 || 43–55 || W1
|-style=background:#fbb
|99||July 24||Mets|| 3–5 || deGrom (12–3) || Richard (5–11) || Reed (17) || 23,325 || 43–56 || L1
|-style=background:#fbb
|100||July 25||Mets|| 5–6 || Lugo (5–2) || Torres (5–3) || Reed (18) || 28,024 || 43–57 || L2
|-style=background:#cfc
|101||July 26||Mets|| 6–3 || Chacín (10–7) || Matz (2–4) || Hand (4) || 19,281 || 44–57 || W1
|-style=background:#cfc
|102||July 27||Mets|| 7–5 || Perdomo (5–5) || Flexen (0–1) || Hand (5) || 26,262 || 45–57 || W2
|-style=background:#cfc
|103||July 28||Pirates|| 3–2 || Wood (2–3) || Hudson (2–5) || Hand (6) || 24,215 || 46–57 || W3
|-style=background:#cfc
|104||July 29||Pirates|| 4–2 || Lamet (5–4) || Nova (10–8) || Yates (1) || 37,286 || 47–57 || W4
|-style=background:#fbb
|105||July 30||Pirates|| 1–7 || Cole (9–7) || Richard (5–12) || — || 30,267 || 47–58 || L1
|-

|-style=background:#cfc
|106||August 1||Twins|| 3–0 || Chacín (11–7) || Berríos (9–5) || Hand (7) || 24,491 || 48–58 || W1
|-style=background:#fbb
|107||August 2||Twins|| 2–5 || Santana (12–7) || Perdomo (5–6) || — || 23,806 || 48–59 || L1
|-style=background:#fbb
|108||August 4||@ Pirates|| 6–10 || Schugel (2–0) || Yates (2–2) || — || 32,243 || 48–60 || L2
|-style=background:#cfc
|109||August 5||@ Pirates|| 5–2 || Lamet (6–4) || Cole (9–8) || Hand (8) || 31,817 || 49–60 || W1
|-style=background:#fbb
|110||August 6||@ Pirates|| 4–5 (12) || Neverauskas (1–0) || Baumann (0–1) || — || 34,175 || 49–61 || L1
|-style=background:#fbb
|111||August 7||@ Reds|| 3–11 || Wood (1–4) || Chacín (11–8) || — || 16,240 || 49–62 || L2
|-style=background:#cfc
|112||August 8||@ Reds|| 7–3 || Perdomo (6–6) || Romano (2–4) || — || 13,683 || 50–62 || W1
|-style=background:#fbb
|113||August 9||@ Reds|| 3–8 || Wojciechowski (3–1) || Wood (2–4) || — || 15,450 || 50–63 || L1
|-style=background:#fbb
|114||August 10||@ Reds|| 3–10 || Storen (3–2) || Yates (2–3) || — || 14,915 || 50–64 || L2
|-style=background:#cfc
|115||August 11||@ Dodgers|| 4–3 || Torres (6–3) || Stripling (1–4)  || Hand (9) || 52,898 || 51–64 || W2
|-style=background:#fbb
|116||August 12||@ Dodgers|| 3–6 || Watson (6–4) || Stammen (0–2) || Jansen (31) || 53,230 || 51–65 || L1
|-style=background:#fbb
|117||August 13||@ Dodgers|| 4–6 || Maeda (11–4)  || Perdomo (6–7)  || Jansen (32) || 46,128 || 51–66 || L2
|-style=background:#cfc
|118||August 14||Phillies|| 7–4 || Torres (7–3)  || Pinto (1–1) || Hand (10) || 20,873 || 52–66 || W1
|-style=background:#cfc
|119|119||August 15||Phillies|| 8–4 || Lamet (7–4) || Leiter (1–3) || — || 23,368 || 53–66 || W2
|-style=background:#cfc
|120||August 16||Phillies|| 3–0 || Richard (6–12) || Pivetta (4–8) || — || 21,564 || 54–66 || W3
|-style=background:#fbb
|121||August 17||Nationals|| 1–2 || Jackson (4–2) || Yates (2–4) || Doolittle (13)  || 22,097 || 54–67 || L1
|-style=background:#fbb
|122||August 18||Nationals|| 1–7 || Blanton (2–2) || Perdomo (6–8) || — || 26,747 || 54–68 || L2
|-style=background:#cfc
|123||August 19||Nationals|| 3–1 || Wood (3–4) || Strasburg (10–4) || Hand (11) || 31,590 || 55–68 || W1
|-style=background:#fbb
|124||August 20||Nationals|| 1–4 || González (12–5) || Lamet (7–5) || Doolittle (14) || 29,292 || 55–69 || L1
|-style=background:#cfc
|125||August 22||@ Cardinals|| 12–4 || Stammen (1–2) || Bowman (3–5) || — || 38,767 || 56–69 || W1
|-style=background:#fbb
|126||August 23||@ Cardinals|| 2–6 || Weaver (2–1) || Chacin (11–9) || — || 38,762 || 56–70 || L1
|-style=background:#cfc
|127||August 24||@ Cardinals|| 4–3 || Yates (3–4) || Tuivailala (3–2) || Hand (12) || 38,726 || 57–70 || W1
|-style=background:#fbb
|128||August 25||@ Marlins|| 6–8 || McGowan (8–1) || Yates (3–5) || Ziegler (9) || 22,489 || 57–71 || L1
|-style=background:#fbb
|129||August 26||@ Marlins|| 1–2 (11) || Tazawa (3–3) || Torres (7–4) || — || 19,963 || 57–72 || L2
|-style=background:#fbb
|130||August 27||@ Marlins|| 2–6 || Barraclough (5–1) || Richard (6–13) || — || 23,275 || 57–73 || L3
|-style=background:#fbb
|131||August 28||Giants|| 0–3 || Samardzija (9–12) || Chacín (11–10) || — || 20,594 || 57–74 || L4
|-style=background:#cfc
|134||August 29||Giants|| 6–3 || Perdomo (7–8) || Moore (4–13) || Hand (13) || 19,631 || 58–74 || W1
|-style=background:#cfc
|133||August 30||Giants|| 5–0 || Stammen (2–2) || Blach (8–11) || Hand (14) || 19,691 || 59–74 || W2
|-

|-style=background:#fbb
|134||September 1||Dodgers|| 0–1 || Kershaw (16–2) || Lamet (7–6) || Jansen (36) || 36,767 || 59–75 || L1
|-style=background:#cfc
|135||September 2 (1)||Dodgers|| 6–5 || Hand (3–4) || Báez (3–3) || — || 39,140 || 60–75 || W1
|-style=background:#cfc
|136||September 2 (2)||Dodgers|| 7–2 || Baumann (1–1) || Darvish (2–2) || — || 42,130 || 61–75 || W2
|-style=background:#cfc
|137||September 3||Dodgers|| 6–4 || Chacín (12–10) || Wood (14–2)  || Hand (15) || 33,949 || 62–75 || W3
|-style=background:#fbb
|138||September 4||Cardinals || 0–2 || Martinez (11–10) || Perdomo (7–9) || — || 25,028 || 62–76 || L1
|-style=background:#fbb
|139||September 5||Cardinals|| 4–8 || Wacha (11–7) || Wood (3–5) || — || 17,806 || 62–77 || L2
|-style=background:#fbb
|140||September 6||Cardinals|| 1–3 || Sherriff (1–1) || Lamet (7–7) || Lyons (2) || 21,411 || 62–78 || L3
|-style=background:#cfc
|141||September 7||Cardinals|| 3–0 || Richard (7–13) || Lynn (10–7) || Hand (16) || 21,334 || 63–78 || W1
|-style=background:#cfc
|142||September 8||@ D-backs|| 10–6 || Lyles (1–2) || Corbin (13–12) || — || 27,988 || 64–78 || W2
|-style=background:#cfc
|143||September 9||@ D-backs|| 8–7 || Maton (3–0) || Rodney (4–4) || Hand (17) || 34,156 || 65–78 || W3
|-style=background:#fbb
|144||September 10||@ D-backs|| 2–3 || Ray (13–5) || Perdomo (7–10) || Bradley (1) || 23,854 || 65–79 || L1
|-style=background:#fbb
|145||September 12||@ Twins|| 0–16 || Gibson (10–10) || Wood (3–6) || — || 28,852 || 65–80 || L2
|-style=background:#fbb
|146||September 13||@ Twins|| 1–3 (10)|| Belisle (2–2) || Maton (3–1) || — || 20,018 || 65–81 || L3
|-style=background:#fbb
|147||September 15||@ Rockies|| 1–6 || Chatwood (8–12) || Richard (7–14) || — || 39,243 || 65–82 || L4
|-style=background:#fbb
|148||September 16||@ Rockies|| 0–16 || Anderson (5–5) || Lyles (1–3) || — || 48,247 || 65–83 || L5
|-style=background:#cfc
|149||September 17||@ Rockies|| 4–3 || Yates (4–5) || Holland (3–6) || Hand (18) || 34,634 || 66–83 || W1
|-style=background:#cfc
|150||September 18||D-backs|| 4–2 || Perdomo (8–10) || Corbin (14–13) || Hand (19) || 20,199 || 67–83 || W2
|-style=background:#cfc
|151||September 19||D-backs|| 6–2 || Wood (4–6) || Godley (8–8) || — || 20,101 || 68–83 || W3
|-style=background:#fbb
|152||September 20||D-backs|| 7–13 || Sherfy (2–0) || Stammen (2–3) || — || 25,797 || 68–84 || L1
|-style=background:#cfc
|153||September 21||Rockies|| 3–0 || Richard (8–14) || Anderson (5–6) || Hand (20) || 30,944 || 69–84 || W1
|-style=background:#fbb
|154||September 22||Rockies|| 1–4 || Gray (9–4) || Lyles (1–4) || Holland (41) || 25,273 || 69–85 || L1
|-style=background:#cfc
|155||September 23||Rockies|| 5–0 || Chacín (13–10) || Bettis (1–4) || — || 33,899 || 70–85 || W1
|-style=background:#fbb
|156||September 24||Rockies|| 4–8 || Márquez (11–7) || Perdomo (8–11) || — || 28,339 || 70–86 || L1
|-style=background:#fbb
|157||September 25||@ Dodgers|| 3–9 || Darvish (10–12) || Wood (4–7) || — || 49,419 || 70–87 || L2
|-style=background:#fbb
|158||September 26||@ Dodgers|| 2–9 || Wood (16–3) || Lamet (7–8) || — || 47,432 || 70–88 || L3
|-style=background:#fbb
|159||September 27||@ Dodgers|| 0–10 || Hill (12–8) || Richard (8–15) || — || 47,273 || 70–89 || L4
|-style=background:#fbb
|160||September 29||@ Giants|| 0–8 || Stratton (4–4) || Lyles (1–5) || — || 39,863 || 70–90 || L5
|-style=background:#cfc
|161||September 30||@ Giants|| 3–2 || Baumann (2–1) || Dyson (3–4) || Hand (21) || 40,394 || 71–90 || W1
|-style=background:#fbb
|162||October 1||@ Giants||4–5 ||Strickland (3–3)||Maton (3–2) ||—||38,847||71–91 ||L1
|-

|- style="text-align:center;"
| Legend:       = Win       = Loss       = PostponementBold = Padres team member

Season standings

National League West

National League Wildcard

Record vs. opponents

Roster

Player statistics

Both tables are sortable.

Batting

Players in bold are on the active roster as of the 2022 season.

Note: G = Games played; AB = At bats; R = Runs; H = Hits; 2B = Doubles; 3B = Triples; HR = Home runs; RBI = Runs batted in; SB = Stolen bases; BB = Walks; K = Strikeouts; Avg. = Batting average; OBP = On-base percentage; SLG = Slugging percentage;

Pitching 

Players in bold are on the active MLB roster as of 2022.

Note: W = Wins; L = Losses; ERA = Earned run average; G = Games pitched; GS = Games started; SV = Saves; IP = Innings pitched; H = Hits allowed; R = Runs allowed; ER = Earned runs allowed; BB = Walks allowed; K = Strikeouts

Farm system

Updated as of September 24, 2016

References

External links
San Diego Padres official site
2017 San Diego Padres at baseball-reference.com

San Diego Padres seasons
San Diego Padres
San Diego Padres